KWPS-FM (99.7 FM, "Arkansas Rocks FM") is a radio station broadcasting a classic rock format. Licensed to Caddo Valley, Arkansas, United States, it serves the Arkadelphia, Arkansas area. The station is currently owned by Arkansas Rocks Radio Stations Network.

External links

WPS-FM
Radio stations established in 2013
2013 establishments in Arkansas
Classic rock radio stations in the United States